

Events

January

  January 2 – Line M7 of the Istanbul Metro extends from Mecidiyeköy to Yıldız.
 January 6 – Line M8 of the Istanbul Metro opens between Bostancı and Parseller.
  January 7 – Line T Third Street of the Muni Metro rerouted via the Central Subway to Chinatown.
 January 18 
  – Beijing Subway introduces through service between Line 9 and the Fangshan line.
  – Chongqing Rail Transit: Line 9 extends from Xingke Ave to Huashigou and Line 10 extends from Liyuchi to Houbao.
 January 19 – Mumbai Metro: Line 2 extends from Dahanukarwadi to DN Nagar and Line 7 extends from Aarey to Gundavali.
 January 22 – Line M11 of the Istanbul Metro opens between Kağıthane and Kargo Terminali.
 January 23 – Metro Express: Service extends from Port Louis Victoria to Place d'Armes and Rèduit branch opens.
 January 24 – Blue Line of Lagos Rail Mass Transit partially opens between Mile 2 and Marina.
 January 25 – MTA Long Island Rail Road opens shuttle service between Jamaica and Grand Central Madison via the East Side Access.

February
  February 8 – Line 2 of the Shiraz Metro opens between Qahramanan and Imam Hossein.
  February 10 – Ankeng light rail of the New Taipei Metro opens between Shuangcheng and Shisizhang.
  February 18 – : Line 1 opens between La Salamandre and Karouba and Line 2 opens between Gare de Mostaganem SNTF and Nouvelle Gare Routière.
February 27
  – Line 2 of the Karaj Metro opens between Golshahr 45-metre and Ayatollah Taleghani.
  – MTA Long Island Rail Road begins full service to Grand Central Madison via the East Side Access.

March
  March 1 – Bolshaya Koltsevaya line of the Moscow Metro extends from Kashirskaya to Nizhegorodskaya and from Elektrozavodskaya to Savyolovskaya.
 March 10
  – Luton DART opens between Luton Airport and Luton Airport Parkway.
  – R211A cars enter passenger service on the A line of the MTA New York City Subway.
 March 16
  – MRT Putrajaya line extends from Kampung Batu to Putrajaya Sentral.
  – Line 2 of the Panama Metro extends via a branch line from Corredor Sur to Aeropuerto.
  March 17 – Line 5 of the Dalian Metro opens between Hutan Xinqu and Houguan.
  March 18 – Tōkyū Shin-Yokohama Line opens between Shin-Yokohama and Hiyoshi.

Predicted and scheduled events

April
  April 17 – Line 1 of the Quito Metro opens for commercial traffic.

  April 26 – Estimated opening of the Red Line of the Tel Aviv Light Rail.

June
  June 30 – Milan Metro Line 4 extension to San Babila.
  – Indonesia's Jakarta–Bandung high-speed rail operation start.
  – Greater Jakarta LRT opening.

July
  July 31 – Estimated opening of the Milan Metro Line 4 extension to San Cristoforo.
  – The North Triangle Common Station is scheduled to be partially opened, after various delays in its construction due to disputes in its location.
 – MRTA Yellow Line opening.

August
 August 7 – Tampere light rail Phase 2A will commence operations to Santalahti.
 – Utsunomiya Light Rail opening.
 – MRTA Pink Line opening.

October
  – Planned closure of the PNR Metro Commuter Line to give way for the construction of the North–South Commuter Railway.

November
  – Planned opening of the Thessaloniki Metro.
 – Planned completion of the MBTA South Coast Rail Phase I to New Bedford and Fall River, Massachusetts.

December

Unknown date
  – The first phase of the Réseau express métropolitain in Montreal is scheduled to open in the second quarter.
  – O-Train Trillium Line Stage 2 expected to open in the second quarter.
  – Expected completion of Toronto's Eglinton Crosstown light rail project.
 – Expected opening of the Line 6 Finch West.
 – Expected opening of Santiago Metro Line 2 extension to Hospital El Pino.
 – Expected opening of Santiago Metro Line 3 extension to Plaza de Quilicura.
 – Expected opening of the Line D (Prague Metro).
 – Expected first 200 km/h service.
  – RER E extension to Nanterre-La Folie.
 – Opening of Agra Metro.
 – Opening of Bhoj Metro.
 – claimed Milan–Verona high-speed railway completion.
  – Expected opening of Milan Metro Line 1 extension to Monza.
 –  will start passenger operations in Osaka.
 – Scheduled withdrawn of 201 series from Osaka urban trains managed by JR-West.
 – Extension of the Kita-Osaka Kyuko Railway to Minō-Semba-Handaimae station and Minō-Kayano station.
 – Possible completion of the rail line to Riga Airport (part of Rail Baltica). Due to construction delays, it will be uncertain.
  – Scheduled completion of the Gemas-Johor Bahru Electrification Double Tracking Project.
  – Phase I of the Klang Valley Double Tracking is due completion (Rawang to Simpang, Kuala Lumpur to Simpang Bangsar, Simpang Batu to Kuala Lumpur, Sentul to Simpang Batu and Simpang Bangsar to Salak Selatan).
  – Delivery of 27 additional train sets for the LRT Kelana Jaya Line is scheduled to start.
  – Expected opening of Toluca–Mexico City commuter rail.
 – Earliest claimed completion of Tren Maya intercity railway.
 – The Philippine Department of Transportation expects partial operations of the North–South Commuter Railway by the third quarter of this year.
 – Scheduled rolling stock replacement of all commuter trains departing from Moscow Leningradsky railway station.
 – Expected introduction of Control cars.
 – Riyadh Metro will be opened in 2023.
 – claimed Belgrade-Niš upgrades completion.
 – Busan streetcar opening, the first tram in South Korea after 1968 demolishing.
 – Turkish high-speed network to reach 3,500 km length instead of previously claimed 11,700 km.
 – Expected opening of the Mostytska and Prospekt Pravdy stations on the Syretsko–Pecherska line of the Kyiv Metro as part of the extension to Vynohradar.
 – Edinburgh Trams extension.
 – South Wales Metro opening.
 – Blackpool Tramway extension to Blackpool North railway station begins operation.
 – Tri-mode trainsets to be introduced in the Wales.
 – Oxford–Bedford railway reopening.
 – West Midlands Metro Line 2 is expected to start operations to Brierley Hill.
 – Quarter 3/4: Avelia Liberty trains are expected to be introduced, eventually replacing Acela Express trains along the Northeast Corridor.
 – Los Angeles International Airport Automated People Mover is expected to begin operation.
 – Uinta Basin Rail expected to commence operations.
 – Summer: Amtrak's Great River is expected to begin daily service between Chicago and St. Paul.
  – Quarter 2: Brightline service to Orlando International Airport is expected to begin.
  – Tri-Rail Downtown Miami Link is expected to open.
  – The Link light rail T Line is expected to be extended to the Hilltop neighborhood of Tacoma, Washington.
  – June/July: Honolulu Rail Transit is expected to open between East Kapolei and Aloha Stadium.
  – Late Quarter 2: Expected start of passenger service through the Regional Connector in Los Angeles.
  – Amtrak is expected to begin operating service between New Orleans and Mobile.

References